Aksaray Museum is a museum in Aksaray, Turkey

The first museum collection was established in Zinciriye Medrese in 1969. In 2014 the new museum was opened in its new building. The museum has  open and  closed area. The general appearance of the 3 storey building resembles that of Seljukid cupolas in the city and the fairy chimneys lying to the east of Aksaray.  

There are 15639 items in the museum. 

One of the most important items exhibited in the open area of the museum is the Aksaray stele. It is the lower half of an inscription with a relief of Hittite Storm God. Its dimensions are  88x99x39 cm3. The inscription is in Luwian language. Another group of interesting items is the group of 12 mummies from the Byzantine era. Two of these mummies are cat mummies.

Gallery

References

Museums established in 2014
Museums in Turkey
Buildings and structures in Aksaray Province